Gohar, also known as Chak 8, is a village of Pattoki Tehsil, Kasur District in the Punjab province of Pakistan.

Geography
It is located at 32°28'0N 73°19'0E with an altitude of 206 metres (679 feet).  It is close to Gehlan.

Notable residents

Gohar is famous for two Islamic scholars, namely, Maulana Ishaq Rehmani and Maulana Mohi ud din Salfi.  Molanah Ishaq Rehmani was a member of the Gen Ayub Advisory Council. Monalh Mohi ud din salfi served in Medina University in Saudi Arabia. There is also an Islamic Scholar named Maulana Ishaq.    Prof. Hafiz Muhammad Ayub, a prominent Religious Scholar and was Head of Islamic Studies Department UET Lahore also belongs from notable family of Gohar.

References

Populated places in Kasur District